Quezon, officially the Municipality of Quezon, is a 4th class municipality in the province of Nueva Ecija, Philippines that was named from the 2nd president of the Philippines, Manuel L. Quezon. According to the 2020 census, it has a population of 41,845 people.

Quezon borders, from the south clockwise, Aliaga, Licab, Guimba, and Santo Domingo.

Geography

Barangays
Quezon is politically subdivided into 16 barangays.

Climate

Demographics

Economy

References

External links

 [ Philippine Standard Geographic Code]
Philippine Census Information
Local Governance Performance Management System

Municipalities of Nueva Ecija